Romeo Crennel (born June 18, 1947) is a former American football coach, who was the senior advisor for football performance for the Houston Texans of the National Football League (NFL). A former long-time coaching assistant to Bill Parcells, Crennel served as the head coach of the Cleveland Browns from 2005 to 2008 and the Kansas City Chiefs in 2012, as well an assistant coach for six NFL teams and four collegiate teams. He has over 50 years of coaching experience, which has included consistently being employed as a coach for all but two seasons since 1970, only taking the 2009 and 2013 seasons off following both of his tenures as a permanent head coach. He has five Super Bowl wins as assistant coach, two with the New York Giants and three with the New England Patriots.

From 2014 to 2021, Crennel has served as an assistant coach for the Houston Texans under head coaches Bill O'Brien and David Culley, and served as the team's interim head coach during the 2020 season after O'Brien was fired following an 0–4 start. At 73 years and 115 days of age at the time of his promotion to interim coach, Crennel is the oldest person in NFL history to serve as a head coach, a record previously held by former Chicago Bears head coach/owner and NFL co-founder George Halas, who was 72 years and 318 days old when he coached the final game of his career on December 17, 1967. Crennel was the first Black head coach in Texans franchise history; he was also the first Black noninterim head coach in Browns history.

Playing career
Crennel played baseball and football at Fort Knox High School in Kentucky and Amherst County (Va.) High School before committing to college football at Western Kentucky. Although he was a four-year starter as a defensive lineman, he became an offensive lineman during his senior season at the request of the coaching staff. He was named the team's most valuable player after the switch, but was not drafted and never played in the NFL. While the move may have hindered his draft chances, it increased his knowledge of the game, by experiencing the trenches from both the offensive and defensive side of the football. Crennel earned a bachelor's degree in physical education from Western Kentucky University, and then a master's degree while serving as a graduate assistant for the school in 1970.

Coaching career

Western Kentucky University

After one season as a graduate assistant with Western Kentucky (1970), Crennel served as the defensive line coach for three seasons (1971–1974).

Texas Tech

After four seasons at WKU, he became an assistant for defensive coordinator Bill Parcells and head coach Steve Sloan at Texas Tech for three seasons (1975–1977).

Ole Miss and Georgia Tech

Crennel finished his collegiate career with two seasons as the defensive ends coach for Ole Miss (1978–1979) and one season as the defensive line coach for Georgia Tech (1980).

New York Giants
After spending two seasons as an assistant with the New York Giants, Crennel became the special-teams coach for seven seasons (1983–1989) and the defensive line coach for three seasons (1990–1992). In 1983, he was reunited with Parcells as the head coach.

When Parcells stepped down as Giants head coach after Super Bowl XXV, Crennel stayed with the team under the two-year tenure of Ray Handley.

New England Patriots and New York Jets
Crennel left the Giants after the 1992 season and worked as the defensive line coach for the New England Patriots for four seasons (1993–1996) and for the New York Jets for three seasons (1997–1999) during the time that Parcells was the head coach in each franchise.

Cleveland Browns
Crennel was hired as the Cleveland Browns' defensive coordinator for the 2000 season.

Return to New England
After one season in Cleveland, he filled the same role with the Patriots for four seasons (2001–2004) under long-time friend Bill Belichick. Crennel and Belichick both served as assistant coaches for the New York Giants, Patriots, and New York Jets, all coached by Bill Parcells from 1981 to 1990 and 1996–1999. Crennel helped lead New England to three Super Bowl victories (XXXVI, XXXVIII, and XXXIX).

Before beginning the 2003 playoffs with the Patriots, Crennel interviewed for head-coaching positions with six teams in under 36 hours. He was not offered any jobs and was passed up by the New York Giants, Buffalo Bills, Arizona Cardinals, Chicago Bears, and Atlanta Falcons.

Return to Cleveland
Crennel was hired to replace Butch Davis as head coach of the Cleveland Browns. He went 24–40 in his tenure with the Browns. His team went 6–10 and 4–12 in his first two seasons with the Browns, finishing last or tied for last in the AFC North. The Browns finished the 2007 season with a 10–6 record, just falling short of making the playoffs–only the franchise's second winning season since its revival in 1999. Crennel's success in the 2007 season earned him a two-year contract extension in January 2008.

On December 29, 2008, following a disappointing 4–12 season, Crennel was fired by the Browns.

Kansas City Chiefs
On January 13, 2010, Crennel was hired as the Kansas City Chiefs defensive coordinator, reuniting him with offensive coordinator Charlie Weis and general manager Scott Pioli from their days with the Patriots.

Following Todd Haley's termination as the team's head coach after 13 games in the 2011 season, Crennel was named the team's interim head coach for the remaining three games of the season. Crennel won his first game as the interim head coach of the Chiefs on December 18, 2011, against the then undefeated Green Bay Packers 19–14, which was significant as Crennel snapped the Packers' 19-game winning streak and ended their hopes for a perfect season. Crennel finished his stint as interim head coach with a 2–1 record.  However, in his tenure as a head coach for the Chiefs, Crennel would only win 2 more games finishing with a 4–15 overall record.

On January 9, 2012, Crennel was named the 11th full-time head coach in Chiefs history. Three days later, Crennel announced his intent to remain as defensive coordinator during his tenure as head coach.

On November 5, 2012, Crennel announced he would be stepping down as defensive coordinator and named linebackers coach Gary Gibbs to the vacant position, after a 1–7 start to the season.

On December 1, 2012, Crennel attempted to prevent the suicide of player Jovan Belcher by talking to him and witnessed his death by a self-inflicted gunshot wound to the head. The following day, Crennel coached his team to a 27–21 victory over the Carolina Panthers, the Chiefs' first home victory since defeating the Packers the previous season, and the only other home win during his tenure.

On December 31, 2012, Crennel was fired as head coach.

Houston Texans
On January 20, 2014, Crennel signed a 3-year deal with the NFL's Houston Texans becoming their new defensive coordinator under their new head coach Bill O'Brien. He was one of the highest paid defensive coordinators in the NFL for three seasons (2014–2016), earning roughly $1.8 million per year. Crennel finished the 2016 year with the NFL's #1 ranked defense and in January 2017 was promoted to Assistant Head Coach. On January 20, 2018, he returned to his role as defensive coordinator for the Texans after Mike Vrabel left to become head coach of the Tennessee Titans.

Crennel was named the interim head coach for the Texans on October 5, 2020, after O'Brien was fired following an 0–4 start to begin the 2020 NFL season. In his first game as interim head coach, at the age of 73 years and 115 days, he became the oldest head coach in National Football League history, a game the Texans won 30–14 over the Jacksonville Jaguars. Crennel also became the Texans' first African American head coach in franchise history, albeit on an interim basis. Crennel was retained under new Texans head coach David Culley along with a new coaching staff in 2021, being given the title of senior advisor for football performance on March 10, 2021. Crennel's last game as an NFL coach was on January 9, 2022, a 25–28 loss to the Tennessee Titans, as he announced his retirement from coaching on June 6, 2022.

Head coaching record

* – Interim head coach

Personal life
Crennel had hip replacement surgery in early 2009 and decided to sit out the 2009 football season while recuperating.

References

External links
 Houston Texas profile

1947 births
Living people
American football defensive linemen
American football offensive linemen
Cleveland Browns coaches
Cleveland Browns head coaches
Georgia Tech Yellow Jackets football coaches
Houston Texans coaches
Houston Texans head coaches
Kansas City Chiefs coaches
Kansas City Chiefs head coaches
New England Patriots coaches
New York Giants coaches
New York Jets coaches
Ole Miss Rebels football coaches
Texas Tech Red Raiders football coaches
Western Kentucky Hilltoppers football coaches
Western Kentucky Hilltoppers football players
National Football League defensive coordinators
Sportspeople from Lynchburg, Virginia
Coaches of American football from Virginia
Players of American football from Virginia
African-American coaches of American football
African-American players of American football
21st-century African-American people
20th-century African-American sportspeople